JS Etajima (MSO-306) is the third ship of the Awaji-class minesweepers of the Japan Maritime Self-Defense Force (JMSDF).

Construction and career 
Etajima was laid down on 22 February 2018 and launched on 12 December 2019 by Japan Marine United Yokohama Shipyard. She was commissioned on 16 March 2021 and was incorporated It was incorporated into the 3rd Mine Warfare Group and deployed to Kure.

Gallery

Citations 

Ships built by Japan Marine United
2019 ships
Awaji-class minesweepers